Gajdošík (feminine Gajdošíková) is a Slovak surname. Notable people with the surname include:

 Ján Gajdošík (born 1978), Slovak footballer
 Marek Gajdošík (born 1990), Slovak footballer

Slovak-language surnames